George Chung is an American actor, businessman, film director and TV show producer. He is also a five times world martial arts champion. He was the executive producer for the American reality television series, Call to Cosplay. He is also the executive producer of Bushido Battleground. Chung had the lead role in the 1988 film Hawkeye.

Background
George Chung, a member of the Black Belt Hall of Fame was a 5-time world Karate champion. He is CEO and co-founder of Jungo TV.

Chung, along with Cynthia Rothrock ran a martial arts academy which was destroyed by fire in the 1980s. A new one was opened in Los Gatos, California, and was in operation in 1986. Both Chung and Rothrock are the co-authors of the book, Advanced Dynamic Kicks. Chung and Rothrock dated and lived together as a couple. By late 1989, their relationship was over.

As a Tae Kwon Do instructor, Chung has trained people such as former San Francisco 49ers football players Bill Romanowski, Charles Haley, Ronnie Lott, and Dwight Clark.

Films
Chung's earliest film was  Eyes of the Dragon, a Leo Fong directed film about a martial artist vying for a prized statue. It was also released as Fight to Win and '"Dangerous Passages.The Encyclopedia of Martial Arts Movies, By Bill Palmer, Karen Palmer, Richard Meyers - Page 110 817. Eyes of the Dragon
Chung directed and acted in the 1988 film Jungle Heat, a film about a man whose on is kidnapped. It also featured Leo Fong, Richard Norton, Cynthia Rothrock, and Stan Wertlieb. He played the lead character Alexander “Hawkeye” Hawkamoto in the film Hawkeye which was also released that year. His character teams up with Charles Wilson (played by Chuck Jeffreys), a fellow policeman to track down the killers of his friend.Letterboxd - Hawkeye 1988 Directed by George Chung Along with Leo Fong, he co-directed the film Blood Street, a direct-to-video action film starring Fong in his reprised role as Joe Wong, a character from Low Blow. The film also starred Stack Pierce, Kim Paige, Chuck Jeffrys and Richard Norton.World  Film Geek - REVIEW: Blood Street (1988) He played an Elvis impersonator in the 1992 film Honeymoon in Vegas.

Television
In the late 90s, Chung was producing the children's series Adventures with Kanga Roddy. Chung was the executive producer for the series Call to Cosplay'', which debuted on Myx TV.

Films

Television

Publications
 George Chung, Cynthia Rothrock, Advanced Dynamic Kicks, Black Belt Communications, 1986,

References

External links
 Imdb: George Chung
 USAdojo.com: George Chung

Living people
American male karateka
Martial arts school founders
American male television actors
20th-century American male actors
American film directors of Chinese descent
Place of birth missing (living people)
Year of birth missing (living people)
American television producers
Film directors from California